Laura Huguette Smet (born 15 November 1983) is a French actress. She is the daughter of rock musician Johnny Hallyday and actress Nathalie Baye. In 1986, Johnny Hallyday recorded in her honor the song "Laura", written by Jean-Jacques Goldman.

Early life
She wanted initially to be a theatrical agent like her godfather, Dominique Besnehard. In 1999, she left school and began studying theatre with Raymond Acquaviva.

Career
In 2002, she began her acting career when Xavier Giannoli, on the recommendation of Olivier Assayas, cast her in the role of Charlotte, a young cancer patient in Les corps impatients, and for which she received a nomination for the César Award for Most Promising Actress. In 2003 she starred in Claude Chabrol's film adaptation of the Ruth Rendell novel, The Bridesmaid (La Demoiselle d'Honneur).

In 2004, Smet won the Prix Romy Schneider. In 2006 she played in Le Passager de l'été, a film written and directed by Florence Moncorgé-Gabin, the daughter of Jean Gabin. In 2007 she played Caroline in L'Heure zéro, Pascal Thomas's film adaptation of an Agatha Christie novel.

Filmography
 2002: Les Corps impatients (Eager Bodies), directed by Xavier Giannoli
 2003: La Femme de Gilles, directed by Frédéric Fonteyne
 2004: La Demoiselle d'honneur, directed by Claude Chabrol
 2006: Le Passager de l'été, directed by Florence Moncorgé-Gabin
 2007: UV, directed by Gilles Paquet-Brenner
 2007: L'Heure zéro, directed by Pascal Thomas
 2008: La Frontière de l'aube, directed by Philippe Garrel
 2010: Pauline et François, directed by Renaud Fély
 2010 : Insoupçonnable, directed by Gabriel Le Bomin
 2014: Yves Saint Laurent, directed by Jalil Lespert
 2014: Eden, directed by Mia Hansen-Løve
 2014: 96 hours, directed by Frédéric Schoendoerffer
 2014: Tiens-toi droite, directed by Katia Lewkowicz
 2015: Call My Agent ! (1 episode, in which her mother, Nathalie Baye, also appeared)
 2017: The Guardians, directed by Xavier Beauvois
 2017: Carbon
 2017: Capitaine Marleau
 2019: The Holy Family
 2022: Fauda - Season 4

References

External links

 

1983 births
Living people
People from Neuilly-sur-Seine
French film actresses
French people of Belgian descent
21st-century French actresses